Raniceps raninus, the tadpole fish, is a species of Gadidae fish native to the northeast Atlantic Ocean around the coasts of France, Ireland, and the United Kingdom and the North Sea. It is of no importance to the commercial fishery industry, though it can be found in the aquarium trade and is displayed in public aquaria.

References
 

Gadidae
Fauna of the British Isles
Fish of the North Sea
Fish described in 1758
Taxa named by Carl Linnaeus